Juan Ortega (died 1503) was a Roman Catholic prelate who was appointed Bishop of Potenza in 1502.

Biography
On 16 Nov 1502, Juan Ortega was appointed by Pope Alexander VI as Bishop of Potenza. It is uncertain if he ever took possession of the see. He died before he was consecrated bishop in 1503.

References

External links and additional sources
 (for Chronology of Bishops) 
 (for Chronology of Bishops)  

16th-century Italian Roman Catholic bishops
Bishops appointed by Pope Alexander VI
1503 deaths